South Tyrol Museum of Archaeology is an archaeological museum in the city of Bolzano, South Tyrol, Italy. It is the home of the preserved body of Ötzi the Iceman.

History 
The museum was specifically established in 1998 to house "Ötzi", a well-preserved natural mummy of a man from about 3300 BC (53 centuries ago). This is the world's oldest natural human mummy, a wet mummy, as opposed to mummies preserved by dry conditions in a desert environment. It has offered an unprecedented view of Chalcolithic (Copper Age) European culture. The world's oldest complete copper age axe was found among his extensive equipment which also comprised a rather complex fire lighting kit and a quiver loaded with twelve arrows, only two of which were finished, clothing and a flint knife complete with its sheath.

The body is held in a climate controlled chamber within the museum at a temperature of -6 Celsius and 98% humidity, replicating glacier conditions in which it was found. Along with original finds there are models, reconstructions and multimedia presentations showing Ötzi in the context of the early history of the southern Alpine region.

Converted from a 19th-century bank building, the museum covers the history and archaeology of the southern Alpine region from the Palaeolithic and Mesolithic (15,000 B.C.) up to 800 A.D. In 2006, the museum hosted an exhibition on the mummies of the Chachapoyas culture.

References

Further reading
 .

External links

 Official website
 Museums of the Province of Bolzano-Bozen - Museum of Archaeology

Buildings and structures in Bolzano
Archaeological museums in Italy
Museums in South Tyrol
Museums established in 1998